The golden volute, Iredalina mirabilis, is a species of rare, large, deepwater sea snail, a marine gastropod mollusc in the family Volutidae, the volutes.

This is the only species in the genus; in other words, Iredalina is a monotypic genus.

Distribution
This species is endemic to New Zealand.  It is found off the east coast.

Habitat
This volute lives at depths of between 180 and 700 m, although empty shells are sometimes found in shallower water, presumably carried there by hermit crabs.

Shell description
This rare shell is highly prized by collectors.

The shell height is up to 140 mm, and the width up to 48 mm.

References
 Powell A W B, New Zealand Mollusca, William Collins Publishers Ltd, Auckland, New Zealand 1979 
 Glen Pownall, New Zealand Shells and Shellfish, Seven Seas Publishing Pty Ltd, Wellington, New Zealand 1979 

Volutidae
Gastropods of New Zealand
Gastropods described in 1926
Taxa named by Harold John Finlay